Robinsonia banghaasi is a moth in the family Erebidae. It was described by Walter Rothschild in 1911. It is found in the Brazilian state of Mato Grosso.

References

Moths described in 1911
Robinsonia (moth)